Hopfield dielectric  – in quantum mechanics a model of dielectric consisting of quantum harmonic oscillators interacting with the 
modes of the quantum electromagnetic field. The collective interaction of the charge polarization modes  with the vacuum excitations, photons
leads to the perturbation of both the linear dispersion relation of photons and constant dispersion of  charge waves  by the avoided crossing between the two dispersion lines of polaritons. 
Similarly to the acoustic and the optical phonons and far from the resonance one branch is photon-like while the other charge wave-like.
Mathematically the Hopfield dielectric for the one mode of excitation is equivalent to the Trojan wave packet in the harmonic
approximation. The Hopfield model of the dielectric predicts the existence of eternal trapped frozen photons similar to 
the Hawking radiation  inside the matter with 
the density proportional to the strength of the matter-field coupling.

Theory

The Hamiltonian of the quantized Lorentz dielectric consisting of  harmonic oscillators interacting with the 
quantum electromagnetic field can be written in the dipole approximation as:

where 

is the electric field operator acting at the position .

Expressing it in terms of the creation and annihilation operators for the harmonic oscillators we get

Assuming oscillators to be on some kind of the regular solid lattice and applying the polaritonic 
Fourier transform 

and defining projections of oscillator charge waves onto the electromagnetic field
polarization directions

after dropping the longitudinal contributions not interacting with the electromagnetic field  one may obtain the Hopfield Hamiltonian 

Because the interaction is not
mixing polarizations this can be transformed to the normal form with the eigen-frequencies of two polaritonic branches:

with the eigenvalue equation

where

,
with

(vacuum photon dispersion)
and

is the dimensionless coupling constant proportional to the density  of the dielectric with
the Lorentz frequency  (tight-binding charge wave dispersion).
One may notice that unlike in the vacuum of the electromagnetic field without matter the expectation
value of the average photon number  is non zero in the ground state of the polaritonic Hamiltonian
 similarly to the Hawking radiation in the neighbourhood of the black hole because of the Unruh-Davies effect. One may readily notice that the lower eigenfrequency  becomes imaginary when the coupling constant becomes critical
that Hopfield dielectric will undergo the superradiant phase transition.

References

Quantum mechanics